FIH  may refer to:
 FIH Erhvervsbank A/S, a Danish corporate and investment bank specialising in lending to Danish corporates
 Falkland Islands Holdings, a company which plays a key role in the economy of the Falkland Islands
 International Hockey Federation, the global governing body for the sport of field hockey
 The Prince's Foundation for Integrated Health, a small charity promoting the healthy lifestyle choices to promotes wellbeing
 Kinshasa International Airport's IATA airport code
 Calcium-sensing receptor, GPCR
 FIH Mobile, a mobile phone manufacturer producing Nokia-branded featurephones.
Fih may refer to :
 Fih, Lebanon, a municipality situated in Koura District